Jalo Walamies (born June 1, 1975 in Jyväskylä, Finland) is a Finnish musician and songwriter. Walamies' music has numerous influences, including country, folk, 1970s rock, and artists such Tom Petty, Bob Dylan, Roger McGuinn, Jeff Lynne and Francis Rossi. His lyrical influences include Kari Peitsamo, J. Karjalainen, Pauli Hanhiniemi, Juice Leskinen and Edu Kettunen. Walamies' third studio album, Tuolla jossain kaukana, was released in 2007.

Discography
"Kaksi Sydäntä" (single) (2004)
Etsimässä Unelmaa (album) (2005)
Elämä on pieni (album) (2006)
Tuolla jossain kaukana (album) (2007)

Music videos
Kaksi Sydäntä (2004), directed by Sakari Lehtinen

External links
 Official site

1975 births
Living people
Finnish male musicians